Raymond (formerly, Wildcat Station) is an unincorporated community in Madera County, California.

Raymond has fewer than 1,000 residents. The community is part of the Madera–Chowchilla Metropolitan Statistical Area. The ZIP Code is 93653. The community is inside area code 559.

History
The area was named either for Israel Ward Raymond, a park commissioner who urged the preservation of Yosemite Valley, or for T. Raymond of Raymond & Whitcomb Travel Association in San Francisco, or for Walter Raymond of Raymond & Whitcomb Travel Association in Boston. Walter Raymond founded the Raymond Hotel in Pasadena in 1886. He planned the hotel and received money for its construction from his father Emmons Raymond, who was a stockholder in the Santa Fe Railroad. When the town of Raymond was dedicated, its residents approached Walter Raymond and offered to name the town after him if he would cut the ribbon at the ceremony.

The first post office opened in 1886. The original name, Wildcat Station, was replaced by Raymond when the Southern Pacific Railroad reached the town in 1886.

Quarry

Raymond has a quarry for sierra white granite. This stone was used to face the Oakland California Temple.

Notable people 
 Thomas Hill (1829-1908), an early California artist. He died in Raymond, California.

References

Unincorporated communities in California
Unincorporated communities in Madera County, California